The  Japan Series was the 37th edition of Nippon Professional Baseball's postseason championship series. It matched the Central League champion Hiroshima Toyo Carp against the Pacific League champion Seibu Lions. The series is notable for being the only time to date in Japan Series history that an eighth game was played. After the first game ended in a tie, the Carp won the next three games. However, the Lions would respond by winning the next four in a row, reverse sweeping the Carp to capture their sixth Japan Series championship and their third title in five years.

Summary

See also
1986 World Series

References

Japan Series
Hiroshima Toyo Carp
Saitama Seibu Lions
Japan Series
Japan Series
Japan Series